The 2016 Varsity Cup was contested from 8 February to 11 April 2016. The tournament (also known as the FNB Varsity Cup presented by Steinhoff International for sponsorship reasons) was the ninth season of the Varsity Cup, an annual inter-university rugby union competition featuring eight South African universities.

No team was automatically relegated to the second-tier Varsity Shield competition for 2017 and bottom side  beat  in a relegation play-off to remain in the competition for 2017.

On 1 March, it was also announced that the round of matches scheduled for 7 March would also be postponed, with the situation at various universities being monitored to determine when the competition would resume. After a meeting by the executive management of Varsity Rugby on 9 March, it was decided that all remaining matches in the competition would be played at neutral venues and that matches should resume on 14 March.

Competition rules and information

There were eight participating universities in the 2016 Varsity Cup. These teams played each other once over the course of the season, either home or away.

Teams received four points for a win and two points for a draw. Bonus points were awarded to teams that scored four or more tries in a game, as well as to teams that lost a match by seven points or less. Teams were ranked by log points, then points difference (points scored less points conceded).

The top four teams qualified for the title play-offs. In the semi-finals, the team that finished first had home advantage against the team that finished fourth, while the team that finished second had home advantage against the team that finished third. The winners of these semi-finals played each other in the final, at the home venue of the higher-placed team.

The bottom team in the Varsity Cup qualified for a relegation play-off against the runner-up of the Varsity Shield at the end of the season.

The Varsity Cup introduced a new scoring system for 2016, where tries could be worth five, seven or nine points, depending on the point where the try-scoring move originated. If the try-scoring move originated in the opponents' 22, it would count five points. If the try-scoring move originated between the halfway line and the opponents' 22, two bonus points were awarded for a seven-point try. If the try originated in the try-scoring team's own half, four bonus points were awarded and the try would be worth nine points. In another change from previous seasons, the points for kicks reverted to the common scoring system used in rugby union – conversions were worth two points, while penalties and drop goals were worth three points.

While the 2014 and 2015 editions of the Varsity Cup saw all matches officiated by two referees, this reverted to just one official for 2016.

The Varsity Cup also retained the White Card system introduced in 2015, but only for the semi-finals and the final. Under this system, either team's coach or captain could refer incidents for further review, similar to the Umpire Decision Review System used in cricket. They could have incidents reviewed that they believed were either given incorrectly or went unnoticed by the on-field referees. Each team was entitled to one review in each half of the match; if a review proved successful, the team retained their white card review for that half, but if it was unsuccessful, they lost the right to further reviews for the remainder of the half.

There were two further changes introduced for the 2016 season. Firstly, if a maul did not move forwards for a period of five seconds, the referee would give the team in possession a further three seconds to use the ball and failure to do so resulted in turnover of possession. Secondly, the traditional "crouch, bind, set" scrum call was changed to "crouch, bind, slide", with the slide call ensuring no impact between the front rows.

There were also some changes to the quota system: the number of players of colour that had to be included in a matchday 23 was increased from six to seven, with three of those in the starting line-up. Teams were allowed to field four first-year students under the age of 22, of which three have to be players of colour. Three additional first-year students could be fielded with no racial quotas, provided they were in Grade 12 at high school in 2015.

Teams

The following teams took part in the 2016 Varsity Cup competition:

Standings

The final standings for the 2016 Varsity Cup were:

Round-by-round

The table below shows each team's progression throughout the season. For each round, their cumulative points total is shown with the overall log position in brackets:

Matches

The following matches were played in the 2016 Varsity Cup:

Round one

Round two

Round three

Round four

Round five

Round six

Round seven

Semi-finals

Final

Honours

The honour roll for the 2016 Varsity Cup was as follows:

Players

Player statistics

The following table contain points that were scored in the 2016 Varsity Cup:

Squads

The following squads were named for the 2016 Varsity Cup:

Discipline

The following table contains all the cards handed out during the tournament:

Referees

The following referees officiated matches in the 2016 Varsity Cup:

See also

 Varsity Cup
 2016 Varsity Rugby
 2016 Varsity Shield
 2016 Gold Cup

Notes

References

External links
 
 

2016
2016 in South African rugby union
2016 rugby union tournaments for clubs